Acacia humifusa is a shrub belonging to the genus Acacia and the subgenus Juliflorae that is endemic to northern parts of Australia.

Description
It has grey or brownish grey coloured bark that is fissured or occasionally smooth. The velvety terete branchlets are a light fawn to dark brown colour. Like most species of Acacia it has phyllodes rather than true leaves. The phyllodes can have a setose point at the apex and have three to four prominent, curved nerves. It blooms from January to April or June to September producing yellow flowers.

Distribution
It is native to an area in the Kimberley region of Western Australia where it is often situated on rocky hilltops and slopes growing in sandy soils over quartzite or sandstone bedrock. It is also found on islands in the Gulf of Carpentaria and thorugh the top end of the Northern Territory as well as from around Cape York in the north down to Cape Cleveland down the east coast of Queensland including many of the islands. It is often found on hillsides or in gorges in shallow sandy and rocky soils as a part of heath, low Acacia woodland or Eucalyptus woodland communities.

See also
List of Acacia species

References

humifusa
Acacias of Western Australia
Plants described in 1842
Taxa named by George Bentham
Flora of the Northern Territory
Flora of Queensland